Lintneria istar, the Istar sphinx moth, is a moth of the family Sphingidae. The species was first described by Walter Rothschild and Karl Jordan in 1903. It is found in mountains and pine-oak woodlands from southern Arizona east to southern Texas and south through Mexico to Guatemala.

The wingspan is 102–114 mm. The upperside of the forewings is dark gray with brown tinges and a series of narrow dashes and a black band. The upperside of the hindwing is black with two white bands.

Adults are on wing from July to September.

The larvae feed on Salvia species.

References

Lintneria
Moths described in 1903